The 2013 Women's Qualification Tournament was the 18th annual rugby tournament organised by FIRA for the continent's national teams and also a qualification tournament for 2014 Women's Rugby World Cup. Six teams took part - the fifth and sixth ranked teams from the Six Nations, based on 2012 and 2013 results, Italy and Scotland; the finalist from the 2012 European Championship, Spain (the winner, England, being already qualified); the two finalists from 2012 European Group B, Sweden and the Netherlands; and  Oceania's entrant Samoa, who were disputing a qualification place from one of the European teams.

These two teams qualified for the World Cup the following year in France. The Spanish won their qualification on the final day by beating Italy, who had been leading the provisional rankings, by a score of 38–7.

Format
The tournament used a split pool format. The six teams were seeded and divided into two pools of three. The teams played one match against each of the teams in the opposite pool. The tournament rankings were determined based on the number of points accumulated from each match.

Round one

Round two

Round three

Leading try scorers

Leading point scorers

See also
Women's international rugby union

Notes

External links

Rugby Europe website
 WRWC Madrid

2013
2013 rugby union tournaments for national teams
International women's rugby union competitions hosted by Spain
2012–13 in European women's rugby union
2012–13 in Scottish rugby union
2012–13 in Italian rugby union
2013 in Samoan rugby union
2013 in Spanish women's sport
2013 in Dutch women's sport
2013 in Scottish women's sport
2013 in Italian women's sport
2013 in Swedish women's sport
2012–13 in Spanish rugby union